Kanbe (written:  or  in hiragana) is a Japanese surname. Notable people with the surname include:

, Japanese manga artist
, Japanese anime director
, Japanese field hockey player
, Japanese actress, model and singer
, Japanese writer
, Japanese fashion model, television personality and singer

Japanese-language surnames